Vegupatti is a small village in Pudukkottai district, Tamil Nadu, India, located three kilometres away from the town of Ponnamaravathi. In the 2011 census of India, Vegupatti had a population of 3009.

References

Villages in Pudukkottai district